FPJ's Ang Probinsyano (abbreviated as FPJAP and internationally known as Brothers) is a 2015 Philippine action drama television series under ABS-CBN Entertainment, replacing Nathaniel. Based on the 1996 film of the same title starring Fernando Poe Jr., the series stars a large ensemble cast that is top-billed by Coco Martin. First aired on September 28, 2015, it became the longest-running drama series on Philippine television (excluding drama anthologies such as Lovingly Yours, Helen,  Maalaala Mo Kaya, Maynila and Magpakailanman), with 1,696 episodes aired until the series finale on August 12, 2022. It was replaced by Mars Ravelo's Darna on its timeslot.

Ang Probinsyano premiered in ABS-CBN where it aired until 2020, when broadcast of the network was halted due to its non-renewal of its franchise. New episodes has since aired in the Kapamilya Channel, a pay network set up by ABS-CBN Corporation with simulcast on the broadcaster's other networks Cine Mo! and Jeepney TV. A2Z and TV5 has also received rights to broadcast Ang Probinsyano through the partnership of the networks' firms with ABS-CBN. The series is also streamed online via iWantTFC, TFC IPTV and Kapamilya Online Live. It is also aired internationally through The Filipino Channel on cable and satellite.

Series overview

Ang Probinsyano has five narrative arcs or "books" consisting of 9 seasons throughout its telecast.

The first book (Syndicate Arc) ran from 2015 through 2017 spanning the first and second seasons and focused on the various cases Cardo encountered as a member of the CIDG, both related and unrelated to its main arc.

The second book (Rebellion and Terrorism Arc) contains the third and fourth seasons of the series and focused on Cardo's encounters with the "Pulang Araw" both as a member of Special Action Force and undercover under the nom de guerre "Agila", and later as part of the vigilante and  far left guerilla group "Vendetta".

The third book (Political Arc) covers the series' fifth and sixth seasons and focuses on the larger political drama in the Philippines.

The fourth book (Crime and Corruption Arc), on the other hand, opened with the series' seventh season and chronicles Cardo's return to the police force and his continued efforts to fight crime and corruption in the country. This is followed by the show's eight season which sees Lily moving to consolidate her power as both the first lady of the Republic and leader of an international drug cartel in the Philippines.

The fifth and concluding book (International Arc) follows the Task Force Agila traveling to north in search for a new hiding place after killing the drug lord Enrique Vera, having avenged the murder of Audrey, the sister of P/Cpt. Lia Mante and daughter of Fernando Mante, in ninth season. The Mante family leaves the country for their safety. Arriving at the north, they successfully rent a place to stay while their enemies are still roaming around to find them. After long struggle in fighting and separation, the members of Task Force Agila are reencounter each other including Oscar Hidalgo, Aurora, Ambo and Elizabeth. With the help of Senate President Camilo Edades, who appointed as an "acting President" by Lily (after she detonates the fake Oscar Hidalgo named Mariano), both Oscar and Camilo are helping each other to expose Lily and Renato's true identity and their abominable crimes and corruptions to the people of the Philippines, many Filipinos are gathering a mass protest outside the Palace against Lily, Arturo and Renato. The Armed Forces of the Philippines, Presidential Security Group and the Philippine National Police stormed down the Palace to set up a blockage preventing Lily from escaping, however she managed to escape alongside the corrupt PSG and Black Ops members who are remained loyal to her and was sent to a safe manor that has been built for long time ago serving as last resort from their enemies, but was later overthrown and executed by Task Force Agila. Even they are succeeded on the operation, their fight is not done yet. Their final enemy Renato Hipolito is hiding on the jungle and he must either captured or killed. As they advance deeper in their territory, they were ambushed and captured by consolidated group of Hipolito and the notorious warlord Lucio Santanar. Many of the Task Force Agila members were brutally tortured and killed, and Cardo was captured again, Renato is about to kill Cardo however Oscar appears and, avenging Task Force Agila, finished off Hipolito and his men to death before the back up arrives, ending his wickedness and greed forever. With the final defeat and deaths of Renato, Arturo, Lily and their subordinates, the reign of violence, greed, corruption, injustice, and anarchy has ended. After an hour of battle, they declared the operation as Pyrrhic victory, many of their comrades died however their sacrifices they made for the country will not be in vain although they emancipate it from the rule of despots and murderers like the likes of Renato, Arturo, and Lily. Eventually, Cardo gets promoted to Police Major by Oscar for his bravery. After reuniting with his family and mourning the death of his grandmother, he decides to stay with them in Botolan. Oscar later marries his first love, Aurora. Unknown to the two of them, while Cardo was off to work, he suddenly spots their daughter Mara who is alive. The two of them smiled and greeted one another, hinting a start of a relationship between them.

Cast and characters

Final

Main
 Coco Martin as PS/Insp. Dominador "Ador" B. de Leon and P/Maj. Ricardo "Cardo" Dalisay
 John Arcilla as Renato "Buwitre" Hipolito
 Angel Aquino as MGen. Diana T. Olegario
 Geoff Eigenmann as P/Maj. Albert De Vela
 John Prats as P/Cpt. Jerome Girona, Jr. 
 Lorna Tolentino as First Lady Lily Ann Cortez-Hidalgo
 Malou Crisologo as Yolanda "Yolly" Capuyao-Santos
 Michael de Mesa as P/Cpl. Ramil "Manager" D. Taduran 
 Raymart Santiago as P/LtCol. Victor A. Basco
 Rowell Santiago as President Oscar Hidalgo and Mariano Patag
 Shaina Magdayao as P/LtCol. Roxanne Opeña

Supporting
 Lordivino "Bassilyo" Ignacio as P/Cpl. Dante "Bulate" Villafuerte
 CJ Ramos as P/Cpl. Patrick Espinosa
 Dax Augustus as Augustus
 Jay Gonzaga as LtCol. James Cordero
 John Medina as P/Maj. Avel "Billy" M. Guzman
 Marc Solis as PS/MSgt. Rigor Soriano
 Nonong Ballinan as Presidential Aide-De-Camp Ambrocio "Ambo" Honorio
 Sancho delas Alas as P/Cpl. Gregorio "Greco" Cortez
 Bryan "Smugglaz" Lao as P/Cpl. Marsial "Butete" Matero
 Whitney Tyson as Elizabeth

Recurring
 Marvin Yap as Elmo Santos
 PJ Endrinal as Wally Nieves
 Bianca Manalo as Lourdes "Bubbles" Torres
 Lester Llansang as P/Cpt. Mark Vargas
 Arlene Tolibas as Marikit Flores
 Daria Ramirez as Auring
 Arlene Muhlach as Loring
 Ella Cruz as Lisa
 Jobert "Kuya Jobert" Austria as Pat. George "Wangbu" Espinosa
 Hyubs Azarcon as P/MSgt. Rolando "Lando" Reyes
 Nico Antonio as Jacinto "Intoy" Santos
 Lorenzo Mara as Ruben
 Rhed Bustamante as Ana
 Kenken Nuyad as Aye
 Donna Cariaga as Doray Mendoza
 Joven Olvido as Carlo "Caloy" Mendoza
 Ghersie Fantastico as Itong
 Ferdinand "Prinsipe Makata" Clemente as Mot
 Mark Manicad as P/Cpt. Edwin Salonga
 Onyok Pineda as Honorio "Onyok" Amaba 
 James "Paquito" Sagarino as Paquito Alvarado
 Rhian "Dang" Ramos as Amanda "Dang" Ignacio
 Shantel Crislyn Layh "Ligaya" Ngujo as Ligaya Dungalo
 Enzo Pelojero as Dexter Flores
 Iyannah Sumalpong as Kristelle "Letlet" Sandoval

Former

Main
 Jaime Fabregas as P/LtGen. Delfin S. Borja
 Maja Salvador as SPO1 Glenda "Glen" F. Corpuz
 Agot Isidro as Verna Syquia-Tuazon
 Bela Padilla as Carmen M. Guzman 
 Arjo Atayde as PC/Insp. Joaquin S. Tuazon
 Albert Martinez as Tomas "Papa Tom" G. Tuazon
 Yassi Pressman as Kapitana Alyana R. Arevalo-Dalisay
 Joel Torre as Teodoro "Teddy" Arevalo
 Shamaine Centenera-Buencamino as Virginia "Virgie" R. Arevalo
 Edu Manzano as President Lucas Cabrera
 Jhong Hilario as Homer "Alakdan" Adlawan
 Sid Lucero as Maj. Manolo "Nolo" Catindig
 Mark Anthony Fernandez as Brandon Cabrera
 Pokwang as Amor Nieves
 J. C. Santos as young Emilio Syquia and Marco Cabrera
 Jolo Revilla as PSG Commander Harold Casilag
 Francis Magundayao as Yohan Hidalgo
 Bobby Andrews as Special Assistant to the President William Celerio
 Ryza Cenon as Aubrey Hidalgo
 Dawn Zulueta as First Lady Marissa Hidalgo
 Alice Dixson Second Lady as Catherine V. Cabrera
 Tirso Cruz III Atty. Arturo "Art" M. Padua
 Marc Abaya as Jacob Serrano
 Ara Mina as Ellen Padua

Very Special Participation
 Lito Lapid as Romulo "Leon" Dumaguit

Very Special Role 
 Susan Roces as Flora "Lola Flora" S. Borja-de Leon
 Eddie Garcia as Don Emilio Syquia/Señor Gustavo Torralba

Supporting
 Joey Marquez as Nanding Corpuz
 Malou de Guzman as Lolit Fajardo-Corpuz
 Mitch Valdes as Konsehala Gina Magtanggol
 Eda Nolan as Brenda F. Corpuz
 Belle Mariano as Rachel S. Tuazon
 Beverly Salviejo as Yaya Cita Roque
 Pepe Herrera as Benjamin "Benny" Dimaapi
 Art Acuña as PS/Supt. Roy Carreon
 Michael Roy Jornales as P/Cpt. Francisco "Chikoy" Rivera
 Marc Acueza as PS/Insp. Bernardino "Dino" Robles
 Rino Marco as PS/Insp. Gregorio "Greg" Sebastian
 Ping Medina as Diego Sahagun
 Mhyco Aquino as Lorenz Gabriel
 Lander Vera Perez as Alfred Borromeo
 Gary Lim as Gaspar Romero
 McCoy de Leon as Juan Pablo "JP" R. Arevalo
 Juliana Parizcova Segovia as Francisco/Francine
 Roy "Shernan" Gaite as Gido
 Pedro "Zaito" Canon, Jr. as Nick
 David Minemoto as David
 Maika Rivera as Cassandra Jose

Introducing
 Heart Ramos as Mary Grace "Gracie" Hidalgo
 McNeal "Awra" Briguela as Macario "Makmak" Samonte, Jr.

Recurring

 Lei Andrei Navarro as Dominador "Junior" G. de Leon, Jr.
 Dennis Padilla as Edgar Guzman
 Ana Roces as Leonora "Nora" Montano-Guzman
 Brace Arquiza as Ryan M. Guzman
 Elisse Joson as Lorraine Pedrosa
 Kiray Celis as Mitch
 Daisy Reyes as Belen Girona
 Jeffrey Tam as Otep
 Benj Manalo as Felipe "Pinggoy" Tanyag, Jr.
 Long Mejia as Francisco "Paco" Alvarado
 Al Vaughn Chier Tuliao as Ricardo "Ricky Boy" A. Dalisay, Jr.
 Tart Carlos as Juanita "J.Lo" Burton
 Xia Vigor as Keana Burton

Guests

Production

Pre-Production
Originally, Martin was supposed to do a different teleserye based on his experiences as an OFW in Canada. This concept was originally floated as a movie starring Martin and superstar Nora Aunor, which the latter turned down  as she was then busy doing other projects. The film with Martin and Aunor would eventually be released in 2016 under the title Padre de Familia. This concept would again be revisited by Martin in his 2022 Metro Manila Film Festival entry, Labyu with an Accent.

With the film's release then uncertain, the concept was turned into a teleserye which necessitated a change in the female lead to co-star with Martin. Judy Ann Santos was approached to be Martin's leading lady. Santos, however, turned down the offer due to unexpected pregnancy. Sarah Geronimo was also approached for the role of leading lady but also had to turn down the offer due to scheduling conflicts. Following this, Martin pitched the idea of adapting Ang Probinsyano.

Martin's abandoned concept would eventually be released the same year as On the Wings of Love and would star James Reid and Nadine Lustre.

The production of On the Wings of Love would also be impacted by Ang Probinsyano, as the character of Jiggs was supposed to be played by Arjo Atayde. Atayde's casting has gone as far as the look test when he was pulled out of the show to play Joaquin Tuazon. Albie Casiño would eventually bag the role of Jiggs.

Concept
Hot off the heels of Martin's portrayal of PS/Insp. Garry Eraña on the "Plano" episode of Maalaala Mo Kaya which served as a tribute to the SAF 44, ABS-CBN President and CEO Charo Santos-Concio floated the idea of creating of an action drama series that particularly aims to give importance to the police force in an effort to help them "regain the love and respect of the people". Coco Martin, who would be later named as the series' lead actor, was involved in the production shoot for the series, proposed that the production team create a television adaptation of Fernando Poe Jr.'s film Ang Probinsyano. When asked why Martin chose to adapt Ang Probinsyano, he explained that he and his grandmother enjoyed watching films of the action star growing up. The widow of Fernando Poe Jr., Susan Roces reportedly gave her blessing to the production team to adopt her late spouse's film.

Ang Probinsyano is not a remake of the 1997 film of the same name. It was made to be run for months to be more suitable for teleserye viewers.

The title of the original film was inspired by the term "pulis patola" which is occasionally used to tease newbie police officers. Since patola, or cucumber of the genus Luffa, is usually grown in the provinces outside urban areas such as Manila, the film was given the title Ang Probinsyano.

A special tribute screening of the film was held on 20 August 2015, in celebration of FPJ's 76th birthday and ahead of the premiere of the TV adaptation. The screening was attended by the cast of the series Coco Martin, Susan Roces, Maja Salvador, Bela Padilla, Beverly Salviejo and Jaime Fàbregas who also served as the film's musical director.

The first trailer of the series was shown on 4 September 2015.

Themes 

Throughout the series' existence, there are numerous themes that centers on the protagonists; will to fight and take risks against the antagonists even in the unlikely scenario in which attempting any deadly mission could end with no one alive, such as family relationships, bravery and fortitude, unconditional love, self-sacrifice, vengeance, and fighting for justice. The series also depicts worsening issues seen om the TV series itself that is based on the ongoing social problems across the country on both the national and regional level, such as drug trafficking, policial corruption, prostitution, human trafficking, worsening poverty, organized crime, and criminality, also transitioning to socio-political issues like governmental corruption, nepotism, business corruption, social injustice, human rights abuses, political murders, bureaucratic corruption, terrorism, usurping elite rule, fascism, and warlordism.

Countering against the above-listed issues, Ang Probinsyano depicts the opposition of the system, guerilla warfare, class struggle, democracy, and the fight and resistance to the decaying and oppressive joint dictatorship of the oligarchy and the aristocracy.

Casting
The adaptation of the series was announced during a press conference on 18 May 2015. The event was attended by ABS-CBN President and CEO Charo Santos-Concio and series cast Coco Martin, Susan Roces, Albert Martinez, Angeline Quinto and Bela Padilla.

To prepare for the role, Martin and other cast members had to undergo police training, Martin likewise attended PNP flag raising ceremonies to immerse himself in the role. Martin also had to learn various martial arts and proper weapons handling. Most his stunts were performed by Martin himself. Martin also serves as the show's creative consultant, later becoming one of the show's directors.

For the role of leading lady, singer-actress Angeline Quinto was supposedly part of the main cast to play the role of Lily, an original character yet different role. Due to her conflicting schedules, however, she was later pulled out from the cast. Quinto was replaced by Maja Salvador, who played the role of Glen. This was Salvador's reunion project with Coco Martin four years after Minsan Lang Kita Iibigin.

In April 2016, Bela Padilla was written off of the show. Padilla revealed that her role was only supposed to be part of the show for its first eight weeks but her character's stay was extended. Padilla's character briefly came back in October 2016, appearing in Cardo's dreams and imploring him to deliver justice for her death.

On the 7 April 2016 episode of the show, Eddie Garcia's character was teased during the funeral of Bela Padilla's character. On the following episode, Garcia's character Don Emilio Syquia would officially be unveiled as part of the show's cast. Between the tail end of 2016 and February 2017, Garcia's character would not make any appearances on the series as Garcia was recuperating from the injuries he sustained from a car accident he figured in. Towards the end of the show's fourth season, the Emilio Syquia character was seemingly killed off following a firefight with show lead Cardo Dalisay. However, the fate of the character was intentionally left ambiguous in order to facilitate his eventual return. Thus, Garcia sat out the rest of Season 5. Garcia would make his return in the show's sixth season under the guise of Señor Gustavo Torralba whose criminal activity has shifted to illegal mining and forced labor. The Emilio Syquia/Gustavo Torralba character would meet a permanent end after another encounter with protagonist Cardo Dalisay, which marked the exit of Garcia from the show after being with the show for almost 3 years. Ang Probinsyano would be the final TV assignment of Garcia as he died on 20 June 2019. A number of the show's cast then took to social media to pay tribute to the screen icon.

In August 2016, Maja Salvador left the series due to expiration of her contract with Dreamscape and numerous prior commitments (including the then-upcoming drama, Wildflower). For many years after her exit from the show, the possibility of her character's return would be the subject of much speculation. Yassi Pressman replaced Salvador as Martin's new love interest and joined the cast in the same month, playing the role of Alyana Arevalo.

In January 2017, the show's popular sidekick, Pepe Herrera exited the show. Herrera left the show to migrate with his family to New Zealand.

To kickoff the opening of the show's second chapter, the series added new cast members, led by Lito Lapid, Mark Lapid, Angel Aquino, John Arcilla, Jhong Hilario, Sid Lucero, Ronwaldo Martin and Mitch Valdez, among others.

In May 2017, Simon Pineda left the series to focus on his studies and numerous prior commitments (including the filming of then-upcoming movies, Loving in Tandem and Ang Panday as well as his conflicts with Your Face Sounds Familiar Kids Season 2 and The Kids' Choice).

In November 2017, Angeline Quinto finally joined the cast as a guest character, playing the role of Regine. Her character lasted until early February 2018.

In March 2018, it was announced that Rowell Santiago, Edu Manzano, Dawn Zulueta and Alice Dixson will be the new additions to the series. Santiago will play the President for the second-time since the hit teleserye Tanging Yaman in 2010. 
On the other hand, Manzano is cast as Vice President Lucas Cabrera. Zulueta and Dixson will play the roles of First Lady Marissa Hidalgo and Second Lady Catherine Cabrera, respectively. Joining them are JC Santos, who previously guested on the show as the young Emilio Syquia, as Marco Cabrera and Mark Anthony Fernandez as Congressman Brandon Cabrera.

On 17 April 2018, Dreamscape Ad Prom Head, Eric John Salut, announced on Instagram that Ryza Cenon who had just transferred from the rival GMA Network was set to join the show as part of the First Family. She was joined by Francis Magundayao and Heart Ramos. On the same day, it was also announced that Jolo Revilla would also be joining the cast.

In January 2019, Ryza Cenon left the series due to numerous prior commitments which includes the then-upcoming drama, The General's Daughter.

In February 2019, it was reported that Lorna Tolentino was set to join the cast of the series as part of the show's sixth season. On 11 March 2019, Tolentino made her debut as Lily Ann Cortez, Pres. Cabrera's bag lady who plans to pit Cabrera against Vendetta and side with whoever comes out victorious. Originally, Tolentino's role was supposed to only last for a month, but the intrigue created by her character led to her appearances being extended and eventually becoming one of the series' top antagonists.

Between February and March 2019, Lito Lapid, Jhong Hilario, Mark Lapid and Edu Manzano left the series in order to focus on their candidacies for the 2019 midterm elections.

On 13 September 2019, Coco Martin confirmed that he is in negotiations with Hollywood actors who can guest in the series. On 8 December of the same year, Martin confirmed that Hollywood actors will join the show in 2020; however this plan was scrapped due to the COVID-19 pandemic.

Broadcast
The series airs weekdays on ABS-CBN's Primetime Bida evening block and worldwide via TFC. A marathon of the week's episode entitled FPJ's Ang Probinsyano: Action Marathon airs on Cine Mo! on Sundays.

In 2019, the series was picked up by Netflix, which began streaming the series' first season under the title Brothers.

On 16 March 2020, the series was put on hiatus and was temporarily replaced by reruns of episodes of May Bukas Pa as part of ABS-CBN's temporary programming changes in response to the Enhanced community quarantine caused by the COVID-19 pandemic in the Philippines which necessitated a halt in its production. On the same day, reruns of the show's first chapter started airing on Jeepney TV under the title FPJ's Ang Probinsyano: Ang Simula.

Amid uncertainty as to its future following ABS-CBN's franchise expiration and the subsequent cease and desist order issued by the National Telecommunications Commission, on 4 June 2020, ABS-CBN announced that the show will return on the air via the Kapamilya Channel and Cine Mo! for cable and satellite TV as well as on TV Plus. For the first two weeks of the show's return, a 10-episode recap will be aired for burning off before the new episodes are released beginning 29 June 2020. On 15 June 2020, Ang Probinsyano made its return on the air under the tagline "Tuloy ang Laban", which is the same day production is slated to resume. Because the tapings entail a 5-week lock-in set-up, Susan Roces begged off joining these tapings. Eventually, an arrangement was worked out to facilitate tapings for Roces as she would be shooting scenes from her own home which was explained in canon by having her character hide separately from Cardo. To prepare for the show's return, Coco Martin met with former series star and current fight director, Senator Lito Lapid, to discuss plans for the series.

Following the airing of Ang Probinsyano's 10-episode recap, its eighth season officially premiered on 29 June 2020. The season 8 premiere was also streamed live on Facebook, Twitter and YouTube Beginning 14 July 2020, Ang Probinsyano will be livestreamed on YouTube. On its maiden livestream as a regular on the platform, the show garnered 56,000 live viewers.

On 10 October 2020, the show resumed airings on free TV via the ZOE Broadcasting Network-owned A2Z Channel 11 and on 8 March 2021, via the MediaQuest Holdings-owned TV5.

On 29 June 2021, Dreamscape Entertainment announced the show will air in 41 countries in Africa via StarTimes PTV Regional network.

Extension
FPJ's Ang Probinsyano was initially set to air until July 2016, but the show was extended up to 2017 because of its action scenes, high ratings and "real life lessons" which were well received by the audience. The series has also been known to educate its viewers about Philippine laws and issues. To mark its first anniversary, a concert entitled FPJ's Ang Probinsyano: Isang Pamilya Tayo the Anniversary Concert was held on 8 October 2016 at the Smart Araneta Coliseum. With the tickets to the event sold-out, the show was also made available on pay-per-view via Sky On Demand.

On 21 April 2017, ABS-CBN announced that the action drama had officially been extended until January 2018. In August 2017, the series celebrated 100 weeks on the air. The following month, the series celebrated its second anniversary.

Owing to the show's consistently high ratings, it went past its January 2018 extension and was given another extension to run until June 2018. With the show maintaining its high ratings, the show was yet again extended up to September 2018, at which point the series celebrated its third anniversary. Said anniversary was celebrated on the 23 September 2018 episode of ASAP.

On 4 July 2018, amid reports that the show was ending in September and will be replaced by either the Judy Ann Santos-starrer Starla or the Angel Locsin-led The General's Daughter, ABS-CBN's Head of Corporate Communication Kane Errol Choa clarified that the show will not be ending any time soon. Choa cited that Martin and his team of writers are "enjoying the process of coming up with creative ideas to make the story more compelling, as well as collaborating with the cast and the production team" on top of the continued high ratings the show registers. As to when the show is ending, cast member Malou Crisologo stated that the show was extended but that the management did not state until when the extension shall run.

On 8 August 2019, Ang Probinsyano aired its 1000th episode, which was celebrated by the show's staff on the set. On 8 December 2019, the show belatedly celebrated its 4th Anniversary on that day's episode of ASAP Natin 'To.

On 22 July 2022, shortly following the conclusion of that night's episode, Martin announced that Ang Probinsyano would end production after a historic 7 year-run, with the final episode being aired on 12 August 2022 to make way for the 2022 remake of Darna, which is scheduled to take over the former program's vacated time slot when the latter premiered on 15 August 2022.

Marketing
To promote the show, ABS-CBN has launched a line of tie-in merchandise which includes school supplies, apparel and toys, among others.

In 2017, an endless runner app based on the show was released. Developed by Xeleb Technologies, the game registered 50,000 downloads in the first five minutes of its release in May and by August of the same year, was approaching one million downloads.

Ang Probinsyano has also been used as the theme of various attractions. Among this is Misyon: Ang Probinsyano, an attraction offered by ABS-CBN Studio XP, which is a 4D interactive theater game with rules that are akin to the Filipino traditional game patintero. Another is the escape room game FPJ's Ang Probinsyano: The Escape Room, a collaboration between ABS-CBN and Left Behind PH that features puzzles and tasks inspired by the series.

Deviations and connections to the film

In the film version, Cardo (Kardo in the film) had a wife and children, who were murdered because the killers had mistaken Kardo for Ador.
Ador's guilt was the reason for their separation in the film version. In the TV series version, their grandmother had young Cardo adopted by a childless couple as a condition for the treatment of Cardo's injuries in Singapore.
Ador and Kardo did not have a grandmother in the film. In the TV series, the twins has a grandmother played by veteran actress Susan Roces, widow of the late Fernando Poe Jr.
Kardo's last name in the film version is still de Leon instead of Dalisay.
Cardo in the TV series is a SAF trooper in Botolan. In the film version, Kardo is Santa Marcela's Police Chief.
The main antagonists in the film version is a drug syndicate. In the TV series, it is a human-child trafficking syndicate whose line of business shifted to drug production and distribution.
The child Kardo adopted in the film version is a girl, while in the TV series version, it is a boy. Later, Cardo and his family would adopt five more children as part of his expanded family.
In the film, Ador's son is named Jerry; while in the TV series, he named his son after him.

Carmen, a love interest in both the film and the TV series is presented differently between the two versions. In the former, Carmen is a night club entertainer and the mother of the child Kardo adopts; whereas in the latter, Carmen is the widow of Ador, replacing the film's Lily as Ador's wife.
Salazar is the surname of the film version's Carmen. In the TV series, Guzman is Carmen's maiden name before she married Ador.
The Glen Corpuz character was originally created for the TV series only.
Ador's superior in the film version, who devised the plan for Kardo to assume Ador's identity, is not Ador and Kardo's grand-uncle.
The person who killed Ador in the film version is a syndicate goon. In the TV series, Ador is killed by the main antagonist, a corrupt policeman.
In the film, the main antagonist is a corrupt police official under the payroll of the drug syndicate. In contrast, the main antagonist in the TV series is a corrupt police officer who is one of the leaders of and a family member of the human trafficking and drug syndicate.
The Paloma Picache character was created for the TV series only, and was an idea proposed by lead actor Coco Martin to Dreamscape Entertainment. Paloma is actually Cardo in drag during his mission to rescue women who were kidnapped by a prostitution syndicate. Martin, who portrayed the character, said that he had to study the mannerisms of a woman for the role. He remarked that this particular role was hard noting that women spend about two hours doing their make-up for a date and on how it is hard and painful to walk on high-heels. Cardo's "Paloma" persona also appeared in a storyline involving the blackmailing case of an American businessman.
Janus del Prado, Tom Olivar, Dindo Arroyo, and Joey Padilla were the cast members from the 1997 film who made guest appearances in the TV series. In addition, Daniel Fernando, Ricardo Cepeda, and Jethro Ramirez, who were part of the 1998 film sequel, also made guest appearances in the telenovela. Jaime Fabregas, a main cast member, served as the musical director for both the film and its sequel. Likewise, Manny Q. Palo, one of the directors of the show, wrote the screenplay to the film's sequel.

Soundtrack

The following is a list of other songs featured in Ang Probinsyano

Ratings
FPJ's Ang Probinsyano is considered one of the most-watched teleserye in the Philippines, garnering the highest-rated pilot episode of all time with 41.6% in 2015. The series would post its highest peak nationwide rating of 46.7% on its 92nd episode in February 2016. The series' highest rating stood for over two years until it was broken in the show's 782nd episode, garnering a nationwide rating of 47.2% in October 2018. The series is well received by the public due to its action sequences, life lessons and crime prevention tips.

Finale reception
After a historic seven-year run on both television and digital platforms, Ang Probinsyano finally had its final wave. The series pulled an all-time high of more than 536,543 concurrent viewers on YouTube.
The series also occupied half of the trending list of Twitter, with #FPJsAngProbinsyano and #FPJAP7MissionAccomplished replacing each other at the top spot.

Despite limited reach on free TV, AGB Nielsen Philippines reported that the series finale received its highest rating of 16.6% on August 12, 2022, placing it in the top spot of the rating board.

Controversies

"Girl in the Rain" episode 
On July 29, 2016, the MTRCB sent a summons to the producers, writers and directors of the show over a scene in its July 25, 2016 episode with "sexually suggestive themes".

The scene in question sees Ella (Vice Ganda) having a hard time changing a flat tire in the rain, when Cardo pulls over to help out. In the course of the scene, double entendres were allegedly used in the dialogue between the characters.

The MTRCB also noted that although the episode showed an apt SPG (Strong Parental Guidance) rating, pursuant to MTRCB Memorandum Circular No. 12-2011, said episode did not contain the appropriate descriptor "SEX" despite the presence of what may be considered 'sexually suggestive' shots in the subject depiction.

A conference was held on August 2, 2016, wherein Malu Sevilla (director), Eileen Garcia (executive producer), Dagang Vilbar (producer), Elaine Songco (network MTRCB coordinator) and John Joseph Tuason (episode writer) attended. MTRCB Chairman Eugenio Villareal noted that the summoned personnel manifested that they had no intention to offend anyone in regard to the subject scene; and they believe that there is room for improvement for the program as regards sensitivity to particular types of audience, for instance, the young and women.

Villareal likewise said that they took note of the show's "self-regulatory resolution" to fight objectification and depict scenes instead where the "dignity of the human person is upheld."

Mt. Arayat as a rebel group stronghold 
Originally, Pulang Araw held camp at Mt. Arayat until SAF Troopers raided said camp, forcing them to escape to the fictional Mt. Karagao.

Behind the scenes, the show began removing all references to the Municipality of Arayat, Pampanga, beginning with its July 18, 2017 episode. However, despite the scrubbing of all mention to Arayat, on July 21, 2017, the Municipal Council of Arayat, Pampanga forwarded a Resolution to the Provincial Board of Pampanga demanding that the show's producers apologize for depicting Arayat "as a haven and breeding ground for terrorists and hoodlums", said its Municipal Mayor Emmanuel Alejandro. The Resolution also "calls for a hearing and to make ABS-CBN apologize for the wrong impressions it created and to correct these [in the long-running telenovela]". The Municipality of Arayat, also contemplated filing charges of libel against ABS-CBN for the show's "damaging" portrayal of the town.

The show's producers reasoned that Arayat was only used in the show nominally and the production has never shot an actual scene in Arayat. The producers said further that there was no intention to portray Arayat in a bad light; that a disclaimer was issued at the beginning of each episode of the show, stating that the characters, incidents and organizations depicted there were purely fictitious and bore no resemblance to actual people and events. ABS-CBN has since apologized to the Municipality of Arayat.

Mayor Alejandrino also directed ire at former Pampanga Governors Mark Lapid and Lito Lapid for their participation in the storyline which taints the reputation of the town and province they once served. Coco Martin, the show's lead is also a native of Pampanga, hailing from San Fernando.

Alejandrino said that the storyline the show is running is a sensitive topic in Arayat, which used to be a bastion for socialist and communist movements from the pre-World War II years up to the 1990s. Alejandrino further said that contrary to what has been the reaction online to the course of action taken by the Municipality, they are not overreacting and that they are only trying to protect the town's image, which has a lucrative tourist market.

Usage of Dingdong Dantes and Marian Rivera's family photos 
The show's production team was called out online by fans of the spouses Dingdong Dantes and Marian Rivera over the alleged unauthorized usage of the spouses' family pictures. The controversy first began gaining steam when a Twitter fan site dedicated to the spouse' daughter Zia, ZiaDantesFanSite posted a video with the caption "Zia's photo was unethically used by ‘Ang Probinsyano’ in Nov 2017. In last night's episode, [Dingdong and Marian] DongYan's photo was edited and used again by the show. Were the photos of Dingdong, Marian and Zia used [and] edited without permission? Dear Ang Probinsyano, strike two na po kayo ah." which was quickly shared by other users and from which Dantes possibly gained knowledge of such usage.

Dantes' response to the controversy was posted on his Facebook account "Courtesy and fair practice must always be observed especially in an established industry like ours. But whether or not it is done within the entertainment sector, we should always be reminded of the basic etiquette for online photo use and sharing that includes asking permission and/or citing sources. I do hope that this won't happen again to anyone." he wrote. In the same post, Dantes also shared an excerpt of his letter to the production team dated August 11, 2018 which read "I appreciate that you found artistic inspiration from the original photos. Unfortunately, there is the inescapable consequence that legal and moral rights were violated here. And as you may very well be aware of, established industry practice is against such act as it amounts to disrespect. Worst of all, as a father and husband, I cannot help but feel offended and deeply hurt by such actions, which happened not just once, but twice. Basic rules of courtesy in this case dictate that you first secure permission from the photographer and my Family."

On August 14, 2018, the production team of FPJ's Ang Probinsyano released a statement apologizing to Dantes and his family. The statement explained that the production team hired a third-party contractor to create the props for the show, of which they were neither aware that the photograph belonged to Dantes nor was it intended to disrespect or offend Dantes and his family.

The producers added that they have already launched an investigation "to prevent a similar incident from happening in the future." Alice Dixson, likewise offered her apology to Dantes.

Negative portrayal of the PNP

Portraying members of the PNP as scalawags 
After numerous special citations from both the PNP, DILG and other agencies, the show was placed at the center of the storm over its portrayal of government agencies, the PNP in particular, as part of the Chapter 3 (Political Arc) of the show.

PNP Chief Oscar Albayalde, though admitting he is a fan of the show, criticized the portrayal of his fictional counterpart, Alejandro Terante (Soliman Cruz). He decried the character of Terante being portrayed as power-hungry and corrupt. Following this, Albayalde withdrew support from the show. Compounding the situation, DILG Secretary Eduardo Año also voiced his displeasure for the show's depiction of the police force. Año also threatened to file a case against the show's producers for the illegal use of insignas and uniform of the PNP, punishable under Art. 179 of the Revised Penal Code, if the show did not change its plot. Senator Panfilo Lacson, a former PNP Chief himself, commiserated with Albayalde as he deemed the adverse depiction of the PNP unfair.

Prior to the PNP's withdrawal of support, however, the series' lead  Coco Martin apologized to the PNP for the perceived negative depiction of the PNP and assured the latter that there is no intent to malign the PNP as evidenced by the disclaimer flashed before the beginning of each episode. Martin also noted that Albayalde, being relatively new to his post, may have misconstrued the arc of the story and gave further assurance that the depiction of the men in uniform as scalawags would not be permanent considering that the story is developing. ABS-CBN, for its part, also assured the PNP that it had no intention to disparage the PNP being that the series is a work of fiction.

Many were also quick to defend the show and criticize the PNP for its sensitivity to its representation in the show. Among those that threw its support for Ang Probinsyano was Senator Grace Poe whose father starred in the original film on which the series is based. Poe points out that the show, apart from keeping the memory of FPJ alive promotes positive values like respect for elders, courage and patriotism. Poe further notes that the original film featured scalawag policemen as antagonists and urged the PNP to look at the story from a bigger picture, that it should not be forgotten that the series protagonist is a policeman himself. Actress Jasmine Curtis-Smith criticized the PNP's reaction over the portrayal of its members on the show, also recalling how Goyo: Ang Batang Heneral earlier ran into the same problem. The Concerned Artists of the Philippines (CAP), on the other hand, condemned the statements of the PNP and DILG as an attack on freedom of expression and likened the same to the AFP's red-baiting of Martial Law film screenings a month earlier. Similarly, the Let's Organize for Democracy and Integrity (LODI) group slammed the PNP's attempt to censor the program and urged Año and Albayalde to "look in the mirror" instead. Netizens also jumped in to the defense of the show.

The MTRCB, through its chair Rachel Arenas, said that it cannot censor the show as the agency is a bridge between constitutionally protected freedom of expression and the right of the state to regulate. She adds that upon review of the show's episodes, she saw nothing objectionable about the portrayal of the police considering that the show still depicts the triumph of good over evil.

After a meeting between Martin and the show's producers with the PNP and DILG, the latter handed its support anew to the show. In a joint statement by ABS-CBN and DILG, it was stated that the latter will continue to support the show "as it continues to inspire Filipinos with the valuable lesson that in the end, good will always triumph over evil." Thereafter, a Memorandum of Understanding was signed between the parties.

"Atake" episode depicting rape and violence against policewomen 
The show once again landed in hot water for a scene in the July 15, 2019 episode showing police women being raped by Bungo (Baron Geisler). Netizens were quick to point that the rape and violence against women shown on screen were too graphic. Members of the PNP also cried that the rape committed upon uniformed officers was a disrespect to their uniforms. In a statement, PNP Deputy Spokesperson Lt. Col. Kimberly Molitas said that the PNP will talk to the production staff of the show and "[d]epending on the extent of the violation [we] may warn them or rescind the said MOU".

Unflattering depiction of PAO 
The negative portrayal of the PNP was not the end of the show's woes, as the same controversy arising from the story arc created an off-shoot problem. PAO Chief Persida Rueda-Acosta also twitted the show for the "unauthorized" usage of PAO's seal, echoing Senator Lacson's statement. Moreover, she cried foul over a scene in the show where it was shown that PAO lawyers were unwilling to take a case that would pit them against the allies of President Lucas Cabrera (Edu Manzano).

Alleged maltreatment of staff 

The show has also been hounded by rumors of its staff being maltreated on the set. Among the rumors that have circulated involves Coco Martin's alleged temper, which according to cast member Arjo Atayde is "a big, big misinterpretation". Atayde went on to explain that the gesture is only meant to remind everyone on the set to observe proper decorum, that Martin cares about the show that he wants it to be perfect as much as possible.

Aside from Martin's alleged bad temper, he has also been alleged to have engaged in dousing the show's staff and cast members with water while they are sleeping. The issue would crop up again a year later when Robin Padilla accused Martin of abusing the show's personnel by pouring water unto them; the former also alleged that Martin argued with a female location director wherein the latter lost his temper. Padilla made the claims amid his rants against ABS-CBN which was facing woes with the impending expiration of its franchise and stonewalling committed by the House of Representatives on the franchise renewal bills filed in its favor. Dreamscape Entertainment, however, refuted Padilla's claim. Dreamacape vehemently denied that Martin maltreated the show's staff and explained that the incidences of water dousing is actually a prank among the cast and crew of the show. This was corroborated by former cast member Atayde, who once again came to the defense of Martin.

On 19 August 2019, Irene Minor, a supposed talent manager supplying talent to the show, became the subject of a complaint on the public service show Bitag. The complainant alleged that Minor was involved in a ponzi scheme and was not paying the talent she brought on the set of the show. Minor contended that ABS-CBN was not paying her and that she was actually advancing payment to her talents through the investment scheme subject of the complaint against her. ABS-CBN, for its part, denied Minor's claims, reasoning that Minor is neither connected to the show nor the network and that it had banned Minor after receiving numerous complaints similar to that being tackled on the program.

The issue would be resurface as an alleged former cameraman of ABS-CBN launched the accusations anew against Martin following his statements rallying support for the franchise renewal of ABS-CBN. Actors, directors and staff members of the show came to the defense of Martin and released statements in support of the show lead, refuting the allegations by the said cameraman point-by-point.

ABS-CBN franchise renewal 

Following Solicitor General Jose Calida's filing of a quo warranto petition before the Supreme Court seeking to nullify ABS-CBN's franchise, the stars of Ang Probinsyano joined the prayer vigil for the renewal of the network's franchise and appealed to members of the Congress to grant the same.

Series lead Coco Martin became one of the most outspoken critics of the Duterte Administration after ABS-CBN was forced off the air without its franchise being renewed. Martin launched tirades against the National Telecommunications Commission and Solicitor General Jose Calida for their hand in the shutdown of ABS-CBN, remarking that they have made fools out of Filipinos; and presidential spokesperson Harry Roque for his statements on the future of ABS-CBN employees and the preferential treatment received by POGOs. This led to internet trolls descending upon Martin's social media accounts, leading the former to deactivate his Instagram account.

Calida would retaliate against Martin during the 1 June 2020 committee hearings of the House of Representatives on the renewal of ABS-CBN's franchise, quipping "He feels that he can solve their problems the same way as he solves them on screen, with macho bluster and bravado. Allegedly, he has apologized for his tantrum", in reference to the Cardo Dalisay character.

In the midst of the controversy, Martin explained that he was passionate about the fate of ABS-CBN because the family he was referring to in his statements was not his nuclear family, but the employees of ABS-CBN. Martin also professed that doing Ang Probinsyano was the cast's service to Filipinos in the Philippines and abroad.

Apart from Martin's statements, Ang Probinsyano and Cardo Dalisay emerged as top twitter trending topics on the day ABS-CBN was forced off the air and after its return to air was announced.

Amidst the hearings for ABS-CBN's franchise renewal, Ang Probinsyano's future continues to be threatened with reports stating that it would end by September 2020. The threat to its future is further compounded by the alias cease and desist order issued to stop the broadcast of TV Plus and Sky Direct, further diminishing the network and the show's reach.

Cultural impact

Sociocultural and political impact

Social commentary and good values
While the show is a work of fiction, and obviates such fact by flashing a disclaimer at the start of each episode, the show has been known to tackle timely societal issues which it integrates into its story. This melding of the fictional and the real has earned the show praise from critics and audiences alike, with some looking at Ang Probinsyano as a "social commentary of our times".

However, while praises have been sung for its realistic portrayal of societal themes, such as the polarizing Philippine Drug War, the long-running series has also been taken to task for perceived "unfair" depiction of various government agencies and its personnel. Nevertheless, many came to the defense of the show, saying that the show is fictional and the government agencies that have been offended should instead cleanse their ranks.

Another example of the show's timely depiction of societal issues is when it aired on its February 15, 2022 episode the presidential debate of its on-going storyline. The airing thereof coincided with the presidential debate held by the controversial SMNI, which was skipped by most a number of the presidential aspirants for the 2022 Philippine presidential election.

In addition to depicting timely issues, the long-running action drama series also has been praised for showing good values on television, such as patriotism, the importance of prayers, acceptance of members of the LGBT, and the paramount role of the family in the Philippine society, among others. Additionally, the show's depiction of the sentiments of its characters to current events resonated well with audiences who found the same relatable. According to sociologist Josephine Placido, the show has earned the title of "Pambansang Teleserye" because of the good values and life lessons that the show depicts on television.

On the other hand, historian Xiao Chua opines that the show gives Filipinos hope as it is structured in the "light-dark-light" form characteristic of Philippine epic poetry, which is also similar to how original film lead Fernando Poe Jr. structured his films. On top of this, the Cardo Dalisay character himself is seen as a role model for being "steadfast and incorruptible".

Moreover, the show extends its cause further by undertaking outreach programs to various communities. Lead star Coco Martin has himself described the efforts put into the show as a service to the nation, for Filipinos in the Philippines and abroad.

Lots of stores and shops moved their closing time earlier to 8pm due to its severe popularity

Ligtas Tips
Aside from portraying timely social issues, the show has been known for producing public service announcements which it calls Ligtas Tips. The PSAs airs during commercial breaks of the show, while infographics are also uploaded on the show's website. In 2017, Ligtas Tips was collected into a book entitled FPJ's Ang Probinsyano Ligtas Tips published by ABS-CBN Publishing.

As a platform for returning actors
The long-running program has become a favorite avenue for major stars of yesteryears to return to television. Most notably, the show has played host to the return of action stars to the small screen after being inactive owing to the decline of the action genre in cinemas. Action star and Senator Ramon "Bong" Revilla Jr. praised Martin and the series as a blessing to former action stars and stuntmen.

High-profile actors and action genre stalwarts, however, are not the sole beneficiaries of the show. Martin has also been known to cast former actors and actresses who are down on their luck in order to give them their second chance in showbusiness, drawing from his experience during his beginnings in the industry and desiring to share the blessings he has reaped through the show. Among these stars that were given their second chance are Mark Anthony Fernandez, CJ Ramos, Rhed Bustamante, Whitney Tyson and Mystica.

Revival of the action genre
The action drama series has not only seen the reintroduction of action stars to television, but has also become channel to revive the long dormant action genre in both film and television. Former series cast Jeric Raval and Jolo Revilla thanked Martin for reviving the action genre, while action star Ronnie Ricketts opines that Martin kept the genre alive.

"Immortality" and superhero status of Cardo Dalisay
Much like the star of the original film, Martin's take on the role has been characterized as "immortal". The tag does not, however, come from Cardo Dalisay's uncanny gunslinging and fighting prowess that allows him to evade bullets and other attacks, but from the many times he has survived being "killed". This includes his "death" at the hands of Marco Cabrera (JC Santos), which was revealed to be a dream sequence and his actual brush with death after being overpowered by Bungo (Baron Geisler) and Lito (Richard Gutierrez). These "deaths" and the numerous extensions the series has enjoyed has made it the subject of jokes and memes among Filipino netizens. Coco Martin himself has acknowledged the numerous memes and jokes and posted his own meme stating that the show is set to end in September 2048. Similarly, these brushes with death have also earned strong reactions from the show's fans.

Martin has described the late Fernando Poe Jr. as his superhero. Similar to Poe, Martin would also attain superhero status in his portrayal of the Cardo Dalisay character, and in the face of ABS-CBN's franchise renewal woes, this would be tested - leading to some branding series star Martin as the "face of the resistance".

Politics
Being the country's top-rating and longest-running action series, the show inevitably became a sought after platform for political endorsements. The show's involvement with politics began with Coco Martin's endorsement of Grace Poe for President in the 2016 national elections. Martin would again endorse Poe in her bid for reelection as a Senator in the 2019 midterm elections.

In a survey conducted by PUBLiCUS Asia, Inc. in 2018, it was found that Martin has the highest endorsement value among celebrities to voters in Metro Manila. Earlier that same year, the names of the characters of the show were used in a mock election conducted by the COMELEC with Cardo Dalisay winning the post of Barangay Chairman.

Martin and leading lady Yassi Pressman also dabbled into endorsing party-list groups, with the two supporting Ang Probinsyano party-list as representatives of the organization's youth sector. The said party-list finished fifth which assured it a seat at the House of Representatives. The partylist bid was contested by former AGHAM Partylist representative Angelo Palmones who alleged that the organization took the name of the television series to circumvent regulations limiting candidates' exposure on television. The partylist received controversy when party-list representative Alfredo de los Santos figured in an incident in Albay that saw him punch a waiter "for no apparent reason". The partylist launched a probe on the incident and De los Santos himself has since then apologized for the incident.

Aside from the endorsement by the show's lead, actors with political aspirations sought exposure in the series to improve their visibility and profile among voters. This necessitated characters played by the candidates to be written off the show before the start of their respective campaign periods. Of the 9 former cast or guest cast members who ran for the 2019 midterm elections, only Lito Lapid and Jhong Hilario emerged victorious. Despite this result however, the show was still considered a kingmaker as factoring Grace Poe finishing at second in the electoral race and two party-list groups bearing the show's name being within the top 10 among the assured seats in the House Representatives, its endorsement value was affirmed.

Special citations

Special citation from the CIDG
In January 2016, Coco Martin was given a certificate of appreciation for his favorable portrayal of a highly dedicated and responsible CIDG Police officer in FPJ's Ang Probinsyano. The citation was given during the 63rd Criminal Investigation and Detection Group (CIDG) Founding Anniversary.

In July of the same year, Martin was invited as a guest at Camp Crame by then-PNP Chief Ronald "Bato" dela Rosa, a self-confessed fan of the show. The visit became an occasion for the top cop to thank Martin for the positive portrayal of the PNP in the series.

Citation from DILG
The show has received high praise from the Interior and Local Government Secretary Ismael Sueno who stated that the police force should take the example of the lead character Cardo.

Commendation from the House of  Representatives
On 14 September 2016, Surigao congressman Robert Ace Barbers filed House Resolution No. 358 at the 17th Congress of the Philippines. The resolution commended the show for its efforts to promote crime awareness and prevention among viewers and endorsed Coco Martin as "Celebrity Advocate for a Drug-Free Philippines."

Awards and recognitions

Notes

See also
Ang Probinsyano (film)
Pagbabalik ng Probinsyano
List of programs broadcast by Kapamilya Channel
List of programs broadcast by Kapamilya Online Live
List of programs broadcast by A2Z (Philippine TV channel)
List of programs broadcast by TV5 (Philippine TV network)
List of programs broadcast by ABS-CBN
List of programs broadcast by Jeepney TV
List of ABS-CBN drama series

References

External links

ABS-CBN drama series
Philippine action television series
Police procedural television series
Law enforcement in fiction
Prison television series
Espionage television series
Serial drama television series
Vigilante television series
Terrorism in fiction
2015 Philippine television series debuts
2022 Philippine television series endings
2020s Philippine television series
Television series by Dreamscape Entertainment Television
Live action television shows based on films
Television shows filmed in Hong Kong
Television shows filmed in Malaysia
Philippine crime television series
Television series about revenge
Fictional vigilantes
Fictional revolutionaries
Fiction about rebellions
Television series about organized crime
Police corruption in fiction
Police misconduct in fiction
Battle royale
Mass murder in fiction
Wrongful convictions in fiction
Gun violence in fiction
Philippine political television series
Filipino-language television shows
2010s prison television series
2020s prison television series
Television productions suspended due to the COVID-19 pandemic
Television controversies in the Philippines